The Protentomidae are a family of hexapods in the order Protura.

Genera
 Condeellum Tuxen, 1963 
 Hinomotentomon Imadaté, 1974
 Neocondeellum Tuxen & Yin, 1982
 Paracondeellum Yin, Xie & Zhang, 1994
 Protentomon Ewing, 1921
 Proturentomon Silvestri, 1909

References

Protura
Arthropod families